Darb-e Hezar (also Romanized as Darb-e Hezār and Darbhezār) is a village in Horjand Rural District, Kuhsaran District, Ravar County, Kerman Province, Iran. At the 2006 census, its population was 45, in 10 families.

References 

Populated places in Ravar County